Euoplozoidae is a family of bryozoans belonging to the order Cheilostomatida.

Genera:
 Euoplozoum Harmer, 1923

References

Cheilostomatida